Tachycineta is a genus of  birds in the swallow family Hirundinidae. There are nine described species all restricted to the Americas.

These are slender swallows with forked tails. Most species have a metallic green back, green or blue head, and metallic blue or unglossed brown wings. All have pure white underparts, and four species have a white rump.
 
Most Tachycineta swallows are at least partially migratory, with only golden and mangrove swallow being essentially resident. All the species use natural or disused cavities for nest sites.

Taxonomy
The genus Tachycineta was introduced by the German ornithologists Jean Cabanisin 1850  with the violet-green swallow (Tachycineta thalassina) as the type species. The genus name is from Ancient Greek takhukinētos meaning "moving quickly".

The genus contains nine species,
divided into two sub-clades that are associated with geography: a North American/Caribbean clade and a South/Central American clade.

References 

 
Hirundinidae